Raghunandan Swarup Pathak (25 November 1924 – 17 November 2007) was the 18th Chief Justice of India. He was the son of Gopal Swarup Pathak, a former Vice President of India.

He was one of the four judges from India to have been on the International Court of Justice in The Hague (the others being Benegal Narsing Rau who served at ICJ during 1952 to 1953 Nagendra Singh who served as its President from 1985 to 1988 and former Supreme Court justice Dalveer Bhandari, who currently sits upon the World Court).
He did his schooling from St. Joseph's College, Allahabad and had studied law at Allahabad University. After practising law at Allahabad, he became Judge at Allahabad High Court in 1962 and later Chief Justice of Himachal Pradesh High Court in 1972.

At the Supreme Court of India 
Pathak was made a judge at Supreme Court of India in 1978 and became its 18th Chief Justice on 21 December 1986. He is remembered as a judge who was a man of the middle and was able to bring relative peace to the Court. He served as Chief justice for two and a half years during which time a dozen judges were appointed to the Court. Five of them — Madhukar Hiralal Kania, Lalit Mohan Sharma, Manepalle Narayana Rao Venkatachaliah, Aziz Mushabber Ahmadi, and Jagdish Sharan Verma— went on to serve as Chief Justices between 1991 and 1998.

Bhopal gas disaster 
Pathak facilitated an out of court settlement between Union Carbide Corporation and the Government of India in 1989 regarding the compensation to be paid for the Bhopal gas tragedy. The government had sought $3.3 billion but received only $470 million and the settlement resulted in the dropping of criminal liability charges against Union Carbide in the case. Within three months of his retirement Pathak became a member of the International Court of Justice at The Hague. The Supreme Court in 1991 upheld the settlement in 1991 thus ending Union Carbide's liability in the case.

Judge of the International Court of Justice 
Pathak was elected a judge of the International Court of Justice and served in that position from 1989 to 1991. He was elected in "casual election" that was held following the death of M. Nagendra Singh, an Indian judge who was then serving his second term at the International Court. In 1991 India decided not to renominate Pathak, who however entered the fray with the backing of Ireland. After the Irish government came under attack in the Dáil from MPs who blamed Pathak for approving, as Chief Justice of India, the $470-million Bhopal gas disaster settlement with Union Carbide, Pathak withdrew from the race.

Oil-for-Food Programme inquiry 

In November 2005, Justice Pathak was appointed to inquire into alleged Indian links in the Oil-for-Food Programme. On 3 August 2006, he submitted his 90-page report which indicted suspended Congress leader and former External Affairs Minister K. Natwar Singh.

Death 
Pathak died on 17 November 2007, at the age of 82 following a heart attack in New Delhi. His death occurred a week before his 83rd birthday.

References

External links
 Official Supreme Court of India Website

Chief justices of India
1924 births
2007 deaths
International Court of Justice judges
Chief Justices of the Himachal Pradesh High Court
20th-century Indian judges
Judges of the Allahabad High Court
20th-century Indian lawyers
Indian judges of United Nations courts and tribunals